A. Robert Hirschfeld (born January 10, 1961) is a bishop in the Episcopal Church in the United States. In 2013 he became the tenth and current bishop of the Diocese of New Hampshire.

Early life and education
Hirschfeld graduated from Dartmouth College in 1983. He completed a master's degree at Berkeley Divinity School at Yale in 1991.

Ordained ministry
Hirschfeld was ordained in the Episcopal Church (United States) on January 18, 1992. He took a post as vice chaplain at Christ Church in New Haven, Connecticut. Following his work at Christ Church, he was Vicar/Chaplain and later rector of St. Mark's Episcopal Chapel on the campus of the University of Connecticut in Storrs. He was then the pastor of Grace Church in Amherst, Massachusetts.

Hirschfeld was elected bishop coadjutor the Episcopal Diocese of New Hampshire on May 19, 2012. On August 4, 2012, he was consecrated as a bishop in Concord, New Hampshire by Katharine Jefferts Schori, Presiding Bishop. Since 2013, he has served as diocesan bishop, and replaced the previous bishop, Gene Robinson, on his retirement in January 2013.

Personal life
Hirschfeld is married to Polly Ingraham, and the couple have three children.

See also
 List of Episcopal bishops of the United States
 Historical list of the Episcopal bishops of the United States

References

Living people
Dartmouth College alumni
American Episcopalians
Berkeley Divinity School alumni
People from Red Wing, Minnesota
1961 births
Episcopal bishops of New Hampshire